The 2010–12 European Nations Cup is the premier rugby union competition below the Six Nations Championship in Europe.

The divisions play on a two-year cycle with the teams playing each other both home and away. From 2009 onward, the title is awarded according to a one-year ranking. Georgia won the 2011 title.

The competition was altered slightly for the 2010–2012 edition. The top division, formerly Division 1, now Division 1A, saw the relegation of Germany, which was replaced with Ukraine. The Division 1B, formerly the Division 2A, was enlarged from five to six teams. No team was relegated from this division, but the Netherlands was promoted from Division 2B.

The champions of 1B will be promoted to 1A for 2013–14, while the last placed team in each division will be relegated. Unlike the previous edition, which also functioned as the 2011 Rugby World Cup qualifying, the 2011–2012 Division 1A edition has no additional purpose.

Division 1A

Points system
Table points are determined as follows:
 4 points for a win
 2 points for a draw
 0 point for a loss
 1 bonus point for scoring 4 tries in a match
 1 bonus point for losing by 7 points or fewer

2011

Table

Results

''The scheduled match between Ukraine and Romania on 12 February 2011 was postponed due to snow and freezing weather in Kyiv on the planned matchday, and was rescheduled to 20 August in Lviv.

2012

Table

Results

Overall table

Division 1B

2010–11

Results

2011–12

Results

Overall table

See also
European Nations Cup (rugby union)
FIRA – Association of European Rugby
Six Nations Championship
Antim Cup

References

External links
FIRA-AER official website

2010-12
2010–11 in European rugby union
2011–12 in European rugby union
2010 rugby union tournaments for national teams
2011 rugby union tournaments for national teams
2012 rugby union tournaments for national teams